is the administrative centre of Fitjar municipality in Vestland county, Norway.  The village is located on the northwestern shore of the island of Stord.  It sits at the southern end of the Fitjarvika bay, a small arm off the main Selbjørnsfjorden.  A large group of small islands lie just off the coast to the west. Fitjar Church is located in this central part of this village.  The historic Battle of Fitjar took place in this area in the year 961.

Name
The village (and municipality) is named after the old Fitjar farm, since the first Fitjar Church was built there. The name is the plural form of fit which means "vigorous meadow".  Before 1900, the name was spelled "Fitje".

References

Villages in Vestland
Fitjar